Maxwell Mitikishe Khobe (1 January 1950 – 18 April 2000) was the Nigerian Commander of The ECOMOG Peacekeeping Force in Sierra Leone and Chief of the Defence Staff of Sierra Leone.

Background & education
Khobe was born in Zekun, Adamawa State and attended the Native Authority Junior Primary School, Dong from 1958 to 1961 and Native Authority Senior Primary School, Numan, from 1962 to 1963. He later attended the Church of the Brethren Mission, Waka Secondary School, Biu, in Borno State from 1964 to 1968. In September 1969, he enlisted as a soldier and subsequently enrolled in the Nigerian Defence Academy (NDA) Short Service Combatant Course 11 from 29 March 1971 until 13 September 1971 when he was commissioned an Infantry 2nd Lieutenant with seniority effective from 29 March 1971.

Career
After playing a commendable role during the so called Dimka coup attempt of 1976, Khobe was encouraged to apply for transfer to the Armoured Corps as a Captain (which he became in 1977), having already attended the Young Officer’s Course (Infantry) and a number of support weapons courses at the School of Infantry.  After joining the Armoured corps, he attended the Armoured Officers Basic Course at Fort Knox, Kentucky and later, the Advanced Armour Officer's Course. He also attended a Gunnery course at the Royal Armoured Corps School, Bovington Camp, UK.    
 
Khobe was 2nd-In-Command of 245 Recce Battalion Ikeja under then Capt. Martin Luther Agwai (who would later become Chief of Army Staff) and was responsible for coordinating the training program of that battalion.

He attended the Command and Staff College in 1983 and was promoted Major in 1984. In August 1985, he led a unit of Tanks in Lagos during the palace coup that removed Major General Muhammadu Buhari from power, ushering in fellow Armoured Corps officer, Major General Ibrahim Babangida.  He was awarded the Forces Services Star in 1986 and became a Lieutenant-Colonel in 1989.  He served four tours of duty in Liberia getting ECOMOG Liberia medals for each one.  In addition he won the coveted Nigerian Army Chief of Army Staff Commendation Award and became a Colonel in 1994.

On 12 February 1998, he led the ECOMOG Ground Task Force assault that removed Major Koromah from power and restored the elected government of President Ahmed Tejan Kabbah.  He was promoted Brigadier and later assumed the position of Chief of Defence Staff of Sierra Leone.

Dates of Promotion
2nd Lieutenant (1971)
Lieutenant (1974)
Captain (1977)
Major (1984)
Lt. Colonel (1989)
Colonel (1994)
Brigadier General (1998)

Death
Khobe died of Encephalitis on 18 April 2000 at the St. Nicholas Hospital in Lagos one week after being evacuated back home from Sierra Leone. Following Khobe's death, the Rukuba Cantonment Jos was renamed Maxwell Khobe Cantonment.

References 

Nigerian generals
Nigerian Army officers
Nigerian Defence Academy alumni
1950 births
2000 deaths

External links 
After the Battle | ECOMOG Versus Sierra Leonean Rebels, Brig. Maxwell Khobe Speaks, January 1999